Lies and Crimes is a 2007 television film starring Estella Warren, Tamara Hope, James McGowan and Joe MacLeod. It was directed by Mario Azzopardi and written by Morrie Ruvinsky.

Plot
A cop's wife gets a surprise when her husband gets murdered in a break in. The break in was meant to kill the cop. The wife, afraid for her life, runs to the house her husband built, away from the protection of cops. Is she really safe there?

External links

Lifetimetv.com: Movies - Lies and Crimes

2007 television films
2007 films
2000s crime films
Films directed by Mario Philip Azzopardi
Lifetime (TV network) films